KFFA may refer to:

 KFFA (AM), a radio station (1360 AM) licensed to Helena, Arkansas, United States
 KFFA-FM, a radio station (103.1 FM) licensed to Helena, Arkansas, United States
 the ICAO code for First Flight Airport